Zhou Guoping (Chinese: 周国平; pinyin: Zhōu Guópíng; born July 25, 1945), is a modern Chinese author, poet, scholar, translator, philosopher, and research fellow at the Institute of Philosophy of the Chinese Academy of Social Sciences.

As of 2017, Zhou has published more than 20 books, some being issued in Japan, Taiwan, Hong Kong and Korea. Most of his works are among the best sellers of their own genre.

Biography 
Zhou was born in Shanghai, where he grew up and attended Shanghai High School. After he graduated from Peking University in 1967, Zhou worked on a Hunan farm for one and a half years. He was later relocated to work in the Tzeyuan town in Guangxi, where he married his first wife, Minzi (Chinese: 敏子).

Zhou was motivated by the resumption of Gaokao, the Chinese college-entrance exam, and started to pursue higher education. In 1978, he left Guangxi and attended the Institute of Philosophy of Chinese Academy of Social Sciences, where he received a masters and a PhD degree.

In the spring of 1980, Zhou’s first marriage ended. He then married Xiang Lingyu (Chinese: 项灵羽). When Zhou was 43, he had his first daughter Niuniu (Chinese: 妞妞), who was diagnosed with and died from a rare cancer, Retinoblastoma. His second marriage ended soon after Niuniu’s death.

In September 1997, Zhou started his third marriage with Guo Hong (Chinese: 郭红), who was twenty years younger than him. Together they had his second daughter Jiujiu (Chinese: 啾啾).

Zhou caused controversy in 2015 by a Weibo post which said that women were beautiful when cleaning the house or feeding babies, which led to him being accused of having straight man cancer.

Positions 
1988 Assistant researcher in the Institute of Philosophy of Chinese Academy of Social Sciences

1994 Researcher in the Institute of Philosophy of Chinese Academy of Social Sciences

2009 Professor of Southwest University of Political Science & Law

2007 Advisor of National Central Library

2013 Honorary Director of Hubei Provincial Library

Work 
Zhou was among the first group of scholars who began to study Friedrich Nietzsche after Chinese economic reform. He was first known for his dissertation Nietzsche: on the Turning Point of the Century and his translated work of Nietzsche’s the Birth of Tragedy.

He was further perceived by the public due to the popularity of his essay, some of which were selected in Chinese and Singapore textbooks because of their philosophical depth and precise use of language.

Selected publications

Niuniu: the Reading Notes of a Father 
Niuniu: the Reading Notes of a Father (Shanghai People's Publishing House, 2006)  was written after the death of Niuniu (Zhou's first daughter) from Retinoblastoma, which was claimed as a result of her doctor’s irresponsible conducts. The book generally describes Zhou’s family life with Yuer and Niuniu and his experience as a father. His detachment from the reality in the book was, according to himself, a tool to relieve the pain.

Men and Eternity
Men and Eternity (Shanghai People's Publishing House, 1987)  was one of the most well-known work of Zhou and was re-published multiple times after its first publication in 1987. The book’s success in the market was attributed to Zhou’s genuine attitude regarding sharing his thoughts as well as the language precision in summarizing his philosophical viewpoints. In the form of short essays, Zhou expresses his thoughts on 26 broad topics, including life, nature, love, beauty and death. In Men and Eternity, Zhou generally expresses the idea of contradiction by nature of these topics and the impossibility of their reconciliation. He points out the contradictions between mankind’s greatness as the only species possesses the ability to pursue the meaning of life and how the process itself degrades the meaning they are pursued, which leads to a nihilistic belief that the human race is a meaningless product of the meaning less universe, making meaningless effort to pursue meanings in its meaningless creator.

The Starry Sky of Thoughts 
The Starry Sky of thoughts (People's Literature Publishing House, 2009)  was a selection of Zhou’s essays, covering topics from reflection of his life to philosophical discussions and comments on social phenomena. The Starry Sky of thoughts includes a great number of articles discussing his viewpoints on arts, including basic standards for arts and his definition of beauty. He states that the absence of audience was a necessary condition for the best and most genuine artwork as they are not affected by any external factors. Zhou also believes that no artworks presents a withering sense of beauty, as beauty is always healthy from artists’ perspectives. In the last few selected articles of the book, Zhou expresses his fear regarding the dominant role technologies play in the modern society. Zhou’s worry about the possibility that mankind was incapable of handling the technologies they invented was thought to embody his objection to utilitarianism and his pursuit of a simple and natural lifestyle.

Souls Only Walk Alone 
Souls Only Walk Alone (People's Literature Publishing House, 2009) is divided into 11 chapters. Covering topics from critiques of social phenomena to reading notes of the Bible, the book is centered around the philosophical discussion of love, souls and life. In Souls Only Walk Alone, Zhou discussed his definition of a noble soul and its indispensability in a proper way of living. He states that for souls to function properly, people need to leave a space for souls alone and that the space should not and could not be shared with anyone else, including families and lovers. He also states that being alone is an inevitable yet beneficial state of souls. Zhou's definition of love as an interaction between two lonely souls instead of an emotional bond which removes the loneliness is thought to embody his pessimistic belief.

Freestyle 
Freestyle (People's Literature Publishing House, 2001) is coauthored by Zhou and the most renowned Chinese Rock musician, Cui Jian (Chinese: 崔健). The book records dialogues between Zhou and Cui across more than ten years. In the preface, Zhou states that his appreciation of Cui might come from their shared viewpoints on arts. Discussing the role of art in the society, they both agree on the importance of art as the ultimate and strongest factor behind politics and culture. They also share the belief that real art is always for the entire human race instead of various cultural groups. The book is viewed as an example of Zhou’s interdisciplinary interest.

Reception  
Niuniu: the Reading Notes of a Father mentioned that Niuniu's cancer was technically curable with a surgery. It was shown that Zhou and Xiang refused to sign the informed consent after knowing the probable consequences of blindness and reoccurrence in Niuniu's twenties. After its publication, the book has fostered numerous debates in medical ethics. Some readers held the belief that Zhou's decision ultimately killed his daughter and that the book was merely driven by hypocrisy.

In one article of the Starry Sky of thoughts, Zhou states that from his viewpoint, the beauty of a woman will inevitably be compromised if she fails to become a good lover, wife, and mother. His words lead to criticisms from numerous feminists. Lu Ping (Chinese: 吕频), a feminist activist, argued that Zhou’s words “was not only ignorant about women, but also contained an arrogant attitude from his ivory tower.”

References

External links
Article by Zhou Guoping at China Digital Times
(zh) Selected Works of Zhou Guoping - Sina
(zh) Zhou Guoping's Blog - Sina
(zh) 

Translators to Chinese
People's Republic of China translators
People's Republic of China philosophers
Academic staff of the Southwest University of Political Science & Law
Writers from Shanghai
Educators from Shanghai
Philosophers from Shanghai
1945 births
Living people
20th-century Chinese translators
21st-century Chinese translators
20th-century Chinese philosophers
21st-century Chinese philosophers